Big Brother 18 is the eighteenth season of the American reality television series Big Brother. The season premiered on June 22, 2016 with a two-hour season premiere, broadcast on CBS in the United States and Global in Canada, and ended with a 90-minute season finale on September 21, 2016, after 99 days of competition. Julie Chen returned as host. On September 21, 2016, season 16 HouseGuest Nicole Franzel was crowned the winner defeating Paul Abrahamian in a 5-4 jury vote. Victor Arroyo was voted as the season's America's Favorite HouseGuest.

Format

Big Brother follows a group of contestants, known as HouseGuests, who live inside a custom-built house outfitted with cameras and microphones recording their every move 24 hours a day. The HouseGuests are sequestered with no contact with the outside world. During their stay, the HouseGuests share their thoughts on their day-to-day lives inside the house in a private room known as the Diary Room. Each week, the HouseGuests compete in competitions in order to win power and safety inside the house. At the start of each week, the HouseGuests compete in a Head of Household (abbreviated as "HOH") competition. The winner of the HoH competition is immune from eviction and  selects two HouseGuests to be nominated for eviction. Six HouseGuests are then selected to compete in the Power of Veto (abbreviated as "PoV") competition: the reigning HoH, the nominees, and three other HouseGuests chosen by random draw. The winner of the PoV competition has the right to either revoke the nomination of one of the nominated HouseGuests or leave them as is. If the veto winner uses this power, the HoH must immediately nominate another HouseGuest for eviction. The PoV winner is also immune from being named as the replacement nominee. On eviction night, all HouseGuests vote to evict one of the nominees, though the Head of Household and the nominees are not allowed to vote. This vote is conducted in the privacy of the Diary Room. In the event of a tie, the Head of Household casts the tie-breaking vote. The nominee with the most votes is evicted from the house. The last nine evicted HouseGuests comprise the Jury and are sequestered in a separate location following their eviction and ultimately decide the winner of the season. The Jury is only allowed to see the competitions and ceremonies that include all of the remaining HouseGuests; they are not shown any interviews or other footage that might include strategy or details regarding nominations. All evicted HouseGuests are eligible to win this award except for those who either voluntarily leave or are forcibly removed for rule violations.

HouseGuests

The twelve new HouseGuests were announced on June 14, 2016. Among them were two siblings of former Big Brother HouseGuests: Paulie Calafiore, brother of Big Brother 16 runner-up Cody Calafiore, and Tiffany Rousso, sister of Big Brother 17 HouseGuest Vanessa Rousso. This was also the fifth season to feature former HouseGuests returning to the game. The four returning players were announced during the premiere episode on June 22, 2016. As part of the House's travel theme, the returning HouseGuests were referred to as "stowaways," entering the House in suitcases shortly prior to the new HouseGuests' arrival.

Future appearances
Jozea Flores was one of two former Big Brother HouseGuests included in a public vote to compete in Big Brother: Over the Top, but he was not chosen to return. Paul Abrahamian returned for Big Brother 19 as a HouseGuest while Nicole Franzel returned to host the first HoH Competition of the season. Abrahamian made a cameo appearance on the series premiere of Celebrity Big Brother during the first HoH competition. In 2020, Da'Vonne Rogers and Nicole Franzel returned to compete for a third time on Big Brother: All Stars. 

Paulie Calafiore appeared on the first season of Ex on the Beach, while Corey and Jozea appeared on the second season. Paulie Calafiore, Natalie Negrotti, Victor Arroyo, Da'Vonne Rogers, and Jozea Flores have all appeared on The Challenge.

Paul Abrahamian, Nicole Franzel, and Victor Arroyo appeared on Big Brother 20 to celebrate Nicole and Victor's engagement. Nicole and Victor later competed on the 31st season of The Amazing Race.

Summary

Episodes

Twists

Teams 
Similar to the cliques twist in Big Brother 11, the HouseGuests initially competed in teams, which were selected by school-yard pick before the first competition. When a HouseGuest won Head of Household, their entire team also earned immunity from nominations, while the team with the worst performance in each Head of Household competition became the Have-Nots for the week.

BB Roadkill 
Following the nomination ceremony, the HouseGuests competed in the BB Roadkill competition, with the winner earning the power to privately nominate a third HouseGuest for eviction. For each Roadkill competition, an RV was placed in the backyard; one at a time, the HouseGuests entered the RV to complete the task. Following the competition, the HouseGuests were privately informed whether they had won or lost the challenge, with no obligation to ever reveal their results. The winner then named a third nominee in the Diary Room. Unlike the Head of Household, the Roadkill winner could nominate a member of his or her own team, provided their intended nominee did not have immunity. If the Roadkill nominee were saved by the Power of Veto, the Roadkill winner had to privately name a replacement nominee. On Day 37, the BB Roadkill competition was officially ended.

Battle Back 
Instead of permanent eviction, the first five evicted HouseGuests received a chance to return to the game. The first two evictees faced off in a duel, with the winner advancing to face the next evicted HouseGuest, permanently eliminating the losers; the remaining evictee will re-enter the house, following four duels. All four duels aired in a special episode on July 22; Jozea defeated Glenn in the first competition, but Victor defeated Jozea, Bronte, and Tiffany in the subsequent competitions to return to the house.

Round Trip Ticket 
Shortly after the end of the Battle Back, Teams and Roadkill twists, the HouseGuests were alerted to the existence of a secret room within the house. To find it, HouseGuests deciphered a series of clues hidden on decorations throughout the house to uncover a five-digit code, and then dialed the code into a phone booth in the house to reveal a tunnel to the room; only one HouseGuest was allowed to enter the room at a time. Inside the room were twelve envelopes, and each HouseGuest could only claim one envelope. Inside one of the envelopes was a "Round Trip Ticket," which would allow the HouseGuest who picked it to re-enter the house immediately following eviction. Envelopes could only be opened by a HouseGuest following their eviction. If a HouseGuest opened their envelope prior to their eviction, their card would be voided. Once all remaining HouseGuests entered the room and picked tickets, they were free to enter the room with no restrictions. The tickets were valid until Day 65; Paul had the Round Trip Ticket, but was not evicted while the tickets were still valid.

America's Care Package 
Beginning in Week 6, Julie announced that for the next five weeks, viewers would be able to give one HouseGuest per week a special power, or "care package", as determined by a public vote. All five powers were revealed to the public upon the twist's introduction. The HouseGuests were made aware of this twist, though the weekly rewards were left unspecified until the package was dropped in the backyard for public unboxing. Once a HouseGuest received a care package, they were no longer eligible to win future packages.

Voting history

Notes

 :  As Victor won the opening competition, his team won immunity for the first two evictions.
 : Following the opening competition, the HouseGuests from the other three teams competed in a three-round competition to remain in the house. Team Freakazoids competed in the third round as individuals and Glenn lost the competition and was instantly evicted.
 : This player was nominated for eviction by the winner of the Roadkill competition.
 :  This player received immunity because a teammate was Head of Household.
 :  Glenn, Jozea, Victor, Bronte, and Tiffany competed for a chance to return to the game. Victor won the competition and re-entered the house.
 :  James was awarded the power to block two HouseGuests from voting in this week's eviction; he chose Corey and Paul.
 : This week was a Double Eviction Week. Following the first eviction, the remaining HouseGuests played a week's worth of Big Brother, including HoH and Veto competitions, and nomination, veto and eviction ceremonies, during the live show, culminating in a second eviction for the week.
 :  Nicole was awarded immunity for the week.
 : Michelle was named Co-Head of Household, earning her the right to make one of the two nominations and their replacement. Michelle's nominations are in bold.
 : As the house’s vote was tied, the Head of Household cast the tie-breaker vote.
 :  Corey earned $5,000 to give to another HouseGuest; accepting the bribe would force that HouseGuest to complete a task. Corey bribed Victor to vote against Michelle.
 :  Da'Vonne, Zakiyah, Bridgette, Paulie, and Victor competed for a chance to return to the game. Victor won the competition and re-entered the house.
 : As Head of Household, Paul chose to evict James.
 : During the finale, the Jury voted for the winner of Big Brother.

Production
On September 24, 2014, CBS announced that it had renewed Big Brother for its 17th and 18th editions for broadcast in summer 2015 and 2016, respectively. The series would continue to be hosted by Julie Chen.

Reception

Controversies
Bronte D'Acquisto and Paul Abrahamian were captured on live feed making racist remarks about fellow HouseGuest James Huling, who is ethnically Korean. Although Huling is a lifelong resident of the United States, D'Acquisto stated that she "will send [Huling] back to Hong Kong". In another incident, while discussing Huling, D'Acquisto said: "I want to kick his little Asian ass back to Hong Kong. Wherever he came from." Furthermore, Abrahamian referred to Huling as a "little Korean man" on multiple occasions. These incidents were not aired on the CBS television broadcasts.

Jozea Flores also created controversy during the beginning of the live feeds, saying that the 4th of July should not be a holiday. When a comment became brought up that "a lot of Americans died for our freedom," Flores replied with, "ain't nobody told them to do that." While his remarks did not make the live feeds, many of the HouseGuests talked about it.

Corey Brooks faced some criticism due to homophobic tweets that were found on his Twitter account, as well as homophobic remarks he made while inside the house. Brooks also faced more controversy after telling a story on the live feeds of his friend attempting to burn a goat. This was not shown on the CBS television broadcasts.

Paulie Calafiore made a series of offensive remarks to fellow HouseGuest Natalie Negrotti about her breast implants. Upon realizing that the house had grown weary of his abuse and running the game, including Negrotti, Calafiore began a campaign of harassment referring to Negrotti's implants and body. Calafiore routinely referring to Natalie as "F.T." (Fake Tits) and telling Negrotti that she was "as fake as those things on her chest." Calafiore also received criticism for his misogynistic and sexist comments about women from New Jersey, stating they "play" men and "spit them out and eat them for breakfast, lunch and dinner." He referred to these type of women as "Jersey Girls" and afterward received backlash from female viewers, particularly those from New Jersey, viewing it as a derogatory comment and reinforcing stereotypes.

Viewing figures

: Episode 19 became delayed to 8:43 PM ET due to the PGA Tour golf event running long.

References

External links
  – official American site
  – official Canadian site
 

2015 American television seasons
18